The 2016 Democratic National Convention was a presidential nominating convention, held at the Wells Fargo Center in Philadelphia, Pennsylvania, from July 25 to 28, 2016. The convention gathered delegates of the Democratic Party, the majority of them elected through a preceding series of primaries and caucuses, to nominate a candidate for president and vice president in the 2016 United States presidential election. Former U.S. Secretary of State Hillary Clinton was chosen as the party's nominee for president by a 54% majority of delegates present at the convention roll call securing it over primary rival Senator Bernie Sanders, who received 46% of votes from delegates, and becoming the first female candidate to be formally nominated for president by a major political party in the United States. Her running mate, Senator Tim Kaine from Virginia, was confirmed by delegates as the party's nominee for vice president by acclamation.

Delegates at the convention also adopted a party platform, through a voice vote, to take to the 2016 elections, touted as the "most progressive" platform in the Democratic Party's history. The progressive shift was often credited to Sanders and the influence of platform-committee members appointed by him. The platform featured a focus on economic issues, such as Wall Street reform, stronger financial regulation, and raising the minimum wage to $15 an hour. Liberal stances on social issues, such as a call for criminal justice reform and an end to private prisons, expansion of Social Security, and the abolition of the death penalty, also feature in the platform.

Senator Elizabeth Warren delivered the keynote address of the convention, with First Lady Michelle Obama and Bernie Sanders serving as headlining speakers on the first day. Former President Bill Clinton served as headlining speaker on the convention's second day, while Vice President Joe Biden and President Barack Obama headlined on day three. Tim Kaine gave his vice presidential nomination acceptance speech on the third day of the convention, while Chelsea Clinton introduced Hillary Clinton to give her presidential nomination acceptance speech on the final day. Clinton's speech was generally well received, and she would go on to have a 7% convention bounce in national polling. Various performers also appeared during the convention, including Demi Lovato, Alicia Keys, Lenny Kravitz and Katy Perry. Overall attendance at the convention was estimated to be around 50,000, according to Anna Adams-Sarthou, a representative of the DNC Host Committee.

The convention was not without controversy, as it was subject to various conflicts between supporters of the presidential campaign of Bernie Sanders and the Democratic Party. In the week prior to the convention, various emails from the Democratic National Committee, the governing body of the Democratic Party, were leaked and published, showing bias against the Sanders' campaign on the part of the committee and its chair, Debbie Wasserman Schultz. Schultz subsequently resigned as chair of the committee, and thus as chair of the Democratic National Convention, with Congresswoman Marcia Fudge taking up the role of Convention chair. Some delegates in support of Sanders staged protests both outside and on the floor of the convention, opposing the nomination of Clinton and Kaine as the party's nominees for president and vice president, respectively.

Clinton and Kaine would go on to win the popular vote in the general election, but ultimately lost the election to the Republican ticket of Donald Trump and his running mate Mike Pence in the electoral college.

Background 
In 2016, the Republican and Democratic conventions were held in late July before the Rio de Janeiro Summer Olympics, instead of after the Olympics as in 2008 and 2012. One reason why the Republican Party scheduled its convention in July was to help avoid a longer, drawn-out primary battle (as in 2012). The Democrats then followed suit, scheduling their convention the week after the Republicans' convention, to provide a quicker response.

Site selection 

The formal bid process was initiated when, in February 2014, the Democratic National Committee sent out letters inquiring into the interest of a number of cities in hosting the 2016 convention. The cities were reported by CNN to have received these letters were Atlanta, Austin, Baltimore, Chicago, Cincinnati, Cleveland, Columbus, Dallas, Detroit, El Paso, Houston, Indianapolis, Kansas City, Las Vegas, Memphis, Miami, Milwaukee, Minneapolis, Nashville, New Orleans, New York City, Oakland, Orlando, Philadelphia, Phoenix, Pittsburgh, Portland, Sacramento, San Antonio, San Diego, San Francisco, Seattle, St. Louis, and Tampa.

In the spring of 2014, the Democratic National Committee sent requests for proposal inviting fifteen cities to bid for the convention. The fifteen cities sent requests for proposals were Atlanta, Chicago, Cleveland, Columbus, Detroit, Indianapolis, Las Vegas, Miami, New York City, Orlando, Philadelphia, Phoenix, Pittsburgh, and Salt Lake City.

Cleveland withdrew its bid in July 2014, having already been selected as the site of the Republican National Convention.

In November 2014, the Democratic National Committee named its three finalist cities, Columbus, New York City, and Philadelphia, thereby eliminating bids from Birmingham and Phoenix.

Philadelphia was selected as the host city on February 12, 2015. The primary venue for the convention would be the Wells Fargo Center, while the Pennsylvania Convention Center was also be utilized. The last convention held in Philadelphia was the 2000 Republican National Convention, and the last time the city had hosted the Democratic Convention was in 1948. Edward G. Rendell, the former mayor of Philadelphia and governor of Pennsylvania, played a crucial role in securing Philadelphia as the host city.

Bids

Winner
Philadelphia (Wells Fargo Center)

Finalists
Columbus (Nationwide Arena)
New York City (Barclays Center)

Other bids
Birmingham (BJCC Coliseum)
Cleveland (Quicken Loans Arena) withdrew bid
Phoenix (US Airways Center)

Host Committee 
The 2016 Philadelphia Host Committee, a 501(c)(3) non-profit, was the official and federally designated presidential convention host committee for the convention, charged with the task of raising the necessary funds to hold the convention. The Host Committee was composed of 10 prominent Philadelphia business executives, civic and other community leaders. The Reverend Leah Daughtry was the CEO.

Email leak 

A cache of more than 19,000 e-mails was leaked on July 22, 2016. This caused Democratic National Committee chair Debbie Wasserman Schultz to resign. Julian Assange, the founder of WikiLeaks, timed the release of the e-mails to occur shortly before the Democratic convention in hopes of maximizing its impact.

U.S. Intelligence agents have identified the Russian government as potentially responsible for the hack of the DNC that led to the leaks, and the U.S. intelligence agencies have "high confidence" that the Russian government was behind the theft.

Planned demonstrations 
By May 19, 2016, five organized groups of Sanders supporters had applied for demonstration permits from the Philadelphia police department. A joint rally between the Poor People's Economic Human Rights Campaign and the Green Party of the United States was denied a protest permit, but both groups planned to go ahead with their protest regardless. The Poor People's Economic Human Rights Campaign, the Green Party, and other groups obtained permits for their demonstrations on July 7 after the American Civil Liberties Union filed a lawsuit that resulted in the city lifting its ban on rush-hour protests during the DNC. On July 12, Philadelphia International Airport workers of the SEIU 32BJ union voted, 461–5, in favor of striking during the DNC in order to seek "better scheduling, clarity on sick pay, a more predictable disciplinary system, and to be able to unionize". However, on July 22, the union and American Airlines reached an agreement, and the planned strike was called off.

The city of Philadelphia expected 35,000 to 50,000 protesters throughout the convention.

Nomination and balloting

Pre-convention delegate count 
The table below reflects the presumed delegate count following the 2016 Democratic primaries:

Presidential ballot 

The Democratic presidential ballot was held on July 26, with Mayor Stephanie Rawlings-Blake of Baltimore presiding over the roll call of states. Senator Barbara Mikulski, the longest-serving woman in the history of Congress, nominated Clinton. Congressman John Lewis and professor Na'ilah Amaru seconded the nomination. Congresswoman Tulsi Gabbard nominated Sanders, with Paul Feeney, the Massachusetts State Director for the Sanders campaign, and Shyla Nelson, a spokeswoman for Election Justice USA, seconding the nomination. During the roll call, several state delegations lauded the accomplishments of both Clinton and Sanders.

After all states had voted, Sanders stated, "I move that the convention suspend the procedural rules. I move that all votes, all votes cast by delegates be reflected in the official record, and I move that Hillary Clinton be selected as the nominee of the Democratic Party for president of the United States." Clinton had made a similar motion during the 2008 convention roll call; however, Sanders (unlike Clinton in 2008) did not move to nominate Clinton by acclamation. Clinton became the first woman to be nominated for president by a major U.S. political party.

Vice presidential nomination 
Clinton had announced her selection of Senator Tim Kaine of Virginia as her running mate on July 22. Some Sanders supporters had discussed the possibility of challenging Kaine's nomination, but Kaine was nominated by acclamation on the third day of the convention. Kaine became the first Virginia native since Woodrow Wilson to be on a major party's ticket. Speculations on who Clinton would pick ranged from Massachusetts Senator Elizabeth Warren to Secretary of Labor Tom Perez.

Platform

Drafting process 
The Platform Committee was co-chaired by former Atlanta mayor Shirley Franklin and Connecticut governor Dannel P. Malloy. The four vice chairs are Nellie Gorbea of Rhode Island, the Rev. Cynthia Hale of Georgia, San Francisco mayor Ed Lee, and Greg Rosenbaum.

Prior to the meeting of the full Platform Drafting Committee, eight meetings in four regions (Mid-Atlantic, Southwest, Midwest, and Southeast) were held: a forum with testimony in Washington, D.C. on June 8 and 9; a forum with testimony in Phoenix, Arizona, on June 17 and 18; a drafting committee meeting in St. Louis, Missouri, on June 24 and 25; and a platform committee meeting in Orlando, Florida, on July 8 and 9.

The Drafting Committee heard testimony from 114 witnesses across the United States, and an additional "1,000 Democrats submitted written or video testimony weighing in on the platform". The drafting committee concluded its work on June 25, sending the draft platform to the full platform committee.

The Drafting Committee consisted of fifteen members. Under party rules, the chair of the Democratic National Committee had the power to name all fifteen members of the Drafting Committee, which has typically been done in the past in consultation with the White House (if a Democratic president is sitting) and the presumptive nominee. In 2016, however, DNC chairwoman Debbie Wasserman-Schultz opted "to allocate 75% of the committee's seats to the presidential campaigns, awarding the slots proportionally according to the current vote tally" in a bid for wider representation of party members. As a result, Clinton appointed six members to the committee, Sanders five, and Wasserman Schultz four. This was the outcome of an agreement among the Bernie Sanders campaign, the Hillary Clinton campaign, and party officials, and was viewed as a victory for Sanders, who gained some influence on the party platform as result.

The drafting committee members, named in May 2016, were as follows:

Hillary Clinton committee appointees:

 Paul Booth of the American Federation of State, County and Municipal Employees
 Carol Browner, former director of the White House Office of Energy and Climate Change Policy and former administrator of the Environmental Protection Agency
 U.S. Representative Luis Gutiérrez from Illinois
 Ohio State Representative Alicia Reece
 Ambassador Wendy Sherman, former senior State Department official
 Neera Tanden, president of the Center for American Progress, "longtime Clinton confidante"

Bernie Sanders committee appointees:

 U.S. Representative Keith Ellison from Minnesota
 Bill McKibben, environmentalist
 Deborah Parker, Native American activist
 Cornel West, author, racial justice advocate
 James Zogby, DNC official, president of the Arab American Institute

Debbie Wasserman Schultz committee appointees:

 Former U.S. Representative Howard Berman from California
 U.S. Representative Elijah E. Cummings from Maryland (chair of the drafting committee)
 U.S. Representative Barbara Lee from California
 Bonnie Schaefer, executive

The Clinton Campaign's Senior Policy Advisor Maya Harris and the Sanders Campaign's Policy Director Warren Gunnels represented their respective campaigns as official, non-voting members of the Drafting Committee. Andrew Grossman was named Platform Executive Director.

Platform provisions 

The full Platform Committee approved the Democratic platform following heated debate in Orlando on July 10, 2016; the platform was formally approved at the convention itself in Philadelphia.

The platform adopted by the platform committee was described by NBC News and by columnist Katrina vanden Heuvel as the most progressive in party history, largely reflecting the influence of platform-committee members appointed by Bernie Sanders.  The platform committee-drafted platform was praised by both Hillary Clinton's campaign and Bernie Sanders' campaign, with Sanders policy director Warren Gunnells saying his campaign achieved "at least 80 percent" of its goals. Although Sanders could have chosen, under party rules, to force a vote on the convention floor using a "minority report" process, he decided not to do so, with Gunnells telling supporters that the campaign had successfully secured the adoption of many of its platform goals and "that further platform fights would be portrayed in the corporate media as obstructionist and divisive".

The platform expresses support for raising the federal minimum wage to $15 an hour and indexing it to inflation, a plank supported by Sanders. The adoption of this point was a boost for the Fight for $15 movement. The platform also calls for ending the sub-minimum wage for tipped workers and workers with disabilities, and for twelve weeks of paid family and medical leave.

On health care, the platform committee adopted a provision supporting a public option for the Affordable Care Act and for legislation to allow Americans ages 55 and over to buy into Medicare. The platform committee voted down a more ambitious Medicare for All proposal supported by Sanders. The platform "repeats the Democratic Party pledge to empower Medicare to negotiate lower prices for prescription drugs" and also calls for "doubling support for community health centers that provide primary health-care services, particularly in rural areas.

The platform expresses support for Wall Street reform, the expansion of Social Security and the abolition of the death penalty, all points supported by Sanders.

On financial regulation (Wall Street reform), the platform supports "a 21st-century Glass-Steagall Act to keep banks from gambling with taxpayer-guaranteed deposits", calls for the breakup of "too big to fail" financial institutions, and supports a tax on excessive speculation.

The platform expresses support for criminal justice reform, calls for an end to private prisons, and reforms to boost police accountability to communities. The platform calls for shutting "the revolving door between Wall Street and Washington," calling for "a ban on golden parachutes for bankers taking government jobs, limits on conflict of interest, and a two-year ban on financial services regulators 'from lobbying their former colleagues.'"

On taxation, the platform pledges "tax relief" to middle-class families. The platform also calls for the end of overseas tax deferral and the carried interest tax loophole, as well as a crackdown on corporate inversions.

On K–12 education, the party's platform was revised "in important ways, backing the right of parents to opt their children out of high-stakes standardized tests, qualifying support for charter schools, and opposing using test scores for high-stakes purposes to evaluate teachers and students." The platform calls for "democratically governed great neighborhood public schools and high-quality public charter schools," and opposes "for-profit charter schools focused on making a profit off of public resources".

On workers' rights, "the platform endorses expanding and defending the right of workers to organize unions and bargain collectively." The platform supports the ability of workers to organize via card check and "calls for a 'model employer' executive order that would give preference in government procurement to employers who provide their workers with a living wage, benefits and the opportunity to form a union."

The platform committee approved compromise language on the controversial practice of hydraulic fracturing (fracking), calling for increased federal, state and local regulation of the practice but not a wholesale ban, as Sanders had pushed for.

The platform drafting committee twice voted down an amendment, supported by Sanders and advanced by one of his appointees,  Rep. Keith Ellison, to commit the party to opposing the Trans-Pacific Partnership trade deal. The committee instead backed a measure that said "there are a diversity of views in the party" on the TPP and reaffirmed that Democratic Party's stance that any trade deal "must protect workers and the environment".

In a close, 81–80 vote, the platform committee approved language supporting the removal of marijuana from Schedule I of the Controlled Substances Act, "providing a reasoned pathway for future legalization" of marijuana.

The platform maintains the Democratic Party's longstanding support for Israel, with DNC chair Debbie Wasserman Schultz terming it the "strongest pro-Israel" platform in the party's history. The platform includes a provision condemning the BDS movement and calling for a two-state solution to the Israeli–Palestinian conflict "that guarantees Israel's future as a secure and democratic Jewish state with recognized borders and provides the Palestinians with independence, sovereignty, and dignity". Proposals for language that would have condemned settlements and called for an end to the Israeli occupation were rejected in the platform committee.

On abortion, the platform states, "We believe unequivocally, like the majority of Americans, that every woman should have access to quality reproductive health care services, including safe and legal abortion—regardless of where she lives, how much money she makes, or how she is insured." It also promises action to overturn the Helms Amendment and the Hyde Amendment, and against efforts to defund Planned Parenthood. This marks the first time the Democratic platform has an explicit call to repeal the Hyde Amendment.

The platform urges U.S. ratification of the Convention on the Elimination of All Forms of Discrimination Against Women and supports passage of the Equal Rights Amendment, saying: "After 240 years, we will finally enshrine the rights of women in the Constitution."

Convention chair 

On July 23, party officials announced that Democratic National Committee chairwoman Debbie Wasserman Schultz would not preside over or speak at the convention. The announcement came after the leak of 20,000 emails by seven DNC staffers from January 2015 to May 2016, during the Democratic primary season. The emails showed the staffers favoring Clinton and disparaging Sanders. Wasserman Schultz's removal from convention activities was approved by both the Clinton and Sanders campaigns. In her place, the Rules Committee named Representative Marcia Fudge of Ohio as convention chair. Chris Cillizza of The Washington Post described this as "a remarkable snub for a sitting party chair".

Superdelegate reform 
On July 24, the DNC Rules Committee voted overwhelmingly, 158–6, to adopt a superdelegate reform package. The new rules were the result of a compromise between the Clinton and the Sanders campaigns; in the past, Sanders had pressed for the complete elimination of superdelegates.

Under the reform package, in future Democratic conventions about two-thirds of superdelegates would be bound to the results of state primaries and caucuses. The remaining one third—Democratic senators, Democratic governors and Democratic U.S. representatives—would remain unbound and free to support the candidate of their choice.

Under the reform package, a 21-member unity commission, chaired by Clinton supporter Jennifer O'Malley Dillon and vice-chaired by Sanders supporter Larry Cohen, is to be appointed "no later than 60 days" after the November 2016 general election. The commission would report by January 1, 2018, and its recommendations would be voted on at the next Democratic National Committee meeting, well before the beginning of the 2020 Democratic primaries. The commission was to consider "a mix of Clinton and Sanders ideas, including expanding 'eligible voters' ability to participate in the caucuses in caucus states, a gripe of Clinton's campaign, and encouraging 'the involvement in all elections of unaffiliated or new voters who seek to join the Democratic Party through same-day registration and re-registration'", which is one of Sanders' demands. The commission drew comparisons to the McGovern–Fraser Commission, which established party primary reforms before the 1972 Democratic National Convention.

Schedule 
Mayor of Baltimore Stephanie Rawlings-Blake, the secretary of the Democratic National Committee, gaveled in the convention on the afternoon of July 25.

According to C-SPAN data, 257 speakers addressed the convention from the podium over the course of the convention.

List of speakers 

 First night (Monday, July 25): Theme: "United Together."
 U.S. Representative Marcia Fudge of Ohio, permanent chair of the convention
 Rev. Dr. Cynthia Hale, Invocation
 Former Mayor of Denver Wellington Webb of Colorado
 State representative Diane Russell of Maine
 U.S. Representative Steny Hoyer of Maryland, the House Democratic Whip
 U.S. Representative Robert Brady of Pennsylvania
 U.S. Representative Brendan Boyle of Pennsylvania
 U.S. Representative Raul Grijalva of Arizona
 U.S. Representative Nita Lowey of New York
 State House Speaker Tina Kotek of Oregon
 State Senate President pro tempore Kevin de León of California
 State House Minority Leader Stacey Abrams of Georgia
 Mayor Jim Kenney of Philadelphia, Pennsylvania
 U.S. Representative Keith Ellison of Minnesota
 Governor Dannel Malloy of Connecticut, chairman of the Democratic Governors Association
 Leah D. Daughtry, CEO of the 2016 Democratic National Convention
 John Podesta, chairman of Hillary Clinton's 2016 campaign
 U.S. Representatives Linda and Loretta Sánchez of California
 Mayor Marty Walsh of Boston, Massachusetts
 Lee Saunders, president of AFSCME
 Lily Eskelsen García, president of the National Education Association
 Mary Kay Henry, president of the SEIU
 Richard Trumka, president of the AFL–CIO
 Sean McGarvey, president of the Building and Construction Trades Department, AFL–CIO
 Randi Weingarten, president of the American Federation of Teachers
 Pam Livengood, New Hampshire grandmother who spoke on the opioid crisis
 U.S. Senator Jeanne Shaheen of New Hampshire
 Singer Demi Lovato
 U.S. Senator Jeff Merkley of Oregon
 Karla and Francisca Ortiz, mother and daughter, speaking about immigration
 DREAMer activist Astrid Silva (headliner)
 U.S. Representative Luis Gutiérrez of Illinois
 Jason and Jarron Collins, professional basketball players
 Jesse Lipson, founder of ShareFile
 Nevada state senator Pat Spearman
 U.S. Senator Bob Casey Jr. of Pennsylvania
 Mayor of Chillicothe, Ohio Luke Feeney
 U.S. Senator Kirsten Gillibrand of New York
 U.S. Senator Al Franken of Minnesota and comedian Sarah Silverman – performed comedy sketch together
 Anastasia Somoza, disability rights advocate
 Eva Longoria, actress
 U.S. Senator Cory Booker of New Jersey
 First Lady Michelle Obama (headliner)
 Cheryl Lankford, speaking about Trump University
 U.S. Representative Joe Kennedy III of Massachusetts (introduced Warren)
 U.S. Senator Elizabeth Warren of Massachusetts (keynote speaker)
 U.S. Senator Bernie Sanders of Vermont (headliner)—final speaker of the night
 Rabbi Julie Schonfeld, delivered closing benediction

 Second night (Tuesday, July 26): Theme: "A Lifetime of Fighting for Children and Families"
 Former U.S. Senator Tom Harkin of Iowa
 Secretary of State of Kentucky Alison Lundergan Grimes
 U.S. Representative Tulsi Gabbard of Hawaii, nominating Bernie Sanders for president
 Paul Feeney, seconding the Sanders nomination
 Shyla Nelson, seconding the Sanders nomination
 Senator Barbara Mikulski of Maryland, nominating Hillary Clinton for president
 U.S. Representative John Lewis of Georgia, seconding Clinton's nomination
 Na'ilah Amaru, seconding Clinton's nomination
 Governor Terry McAuliffe of Virginia
 House Minority Leader Nancy Pelosi of California, appearing alongside several other female House Democrats
 Former State Senator Jason Carter of Georgia, introducing a video message from former President Jimmy Carter
 U.S. Senator Chuck Schumer of New York
 Elizabeth Banks, actress
 Thaddeus Desmond, Philadelphia children's advocate
 Dynah Haubert, Philadelphia attorney for disability rights group
 Kate Burdick, attorney for the Philadelphia-based Juvenile Law Center
 Anton Moore of Philadelphia, founder of nonprofit community organization that speaks to young people about gun violence
 Dustin Parsons of Little Rock, Arkansas, fifth-grade teacher
 Principal and students of Eagle Academy in New York City and Newark
 Daniele Mellott
 Jelani Freeman
 Donna Brazile, Democratic National Committee Vice Chair of Voter Registration and Participation and future interim chair of the Democratic National Committee (effective at the end of the convention)
 Former Attorney General Eric Holder
 Pittsburgh Police Chief Cameron McLay
 Tony Goldwyn, actor
 The Mothers of the Movement (mothers of children killed by gun violence, headliners)
 Cecile Richards, president of Planned Parenthood
 Lena Dunham and America Ferrara, actresses
 Mayor Stephen Benjamin of Columbia, South Carolina
 U.S. Senator Barbara Boxer of California
 Debra Messing, actress
 Joe Sweeney, New York City police detective, 9/11 first responder
 Lauren Manning, wounded at the World Trade Center on 9/11
 U.S. Representative Joseph Crowley of New York
 Erika Alexander, actress
 Ryan Moore, of South Sioux City, Nebraska
 Former Governor Howard Dean of Vermont
 U.S. Senator Amy Klobuchar of Minnesota
 Ima Matul, Indonesian survivor of human trafficking, spoke on anti-slavery and human trafficking programs championed by Hillary Clinton
 Former Secretary of State Madeleine Albright
 Former President Bill Clinton (headliner)
 Meryl Streep, actress
 Pastor Tony Campolo, delivering the benediction

 Third night (Wednesday, July 27): Theme: "Working Together"
 Reverend William J. Byron, S.J., invocation
 Daniel Driffin, HIV/AIDS activist
 Neera Tanden, president of the Center for American Progress Action Fund
 U.S. Representative Sheila Jackson Lee of Texas
 U.S. Representative Michelle Lujan Grisham of New Mexico
 Delegate Eleanor Holmes Norton of the District of Columbia
 U.S. Representative Adam Schiff of California
 U.S. Representative Maxine Waters of California
 Ilyse Hogue, president of NARAL Pro-Choice America
 Mayor Andrew Gillum of Tallahassee, Florida
 U.S. Representative Judy Chu of California, along with several other members of the Congressional Asian Pacific American Caucus
 Brooks Bell, North Carolina tech entrepreneur
 Mayor Bill de Blasio of New York City
 U.S. Representative Ben Ray Lujan of New Mexico
 The Reverend Jesse Jackson
 Star Jones, actress
 Mayor Karen Weaver of Flint, Michigan
 U.S. Representative G.K. Butterfield of North Carolina, chair of the Congressional Black Caucus
 Stephanie Schriock, president of EMILY's List
 U.S. Senate Democratic Leader Harry Reid of Nevada
 Lieutenant Governor Gavin Newsom of California
 U.S. Representative Ruben Gallego of Arizona
 Jaime Dorff, widow of Army helicopter pilot Patrick Dorff
 Mayor Mike Duggan of Detroit, Michigan
 Former Governor Martin O'Malley of Maryland
 Sigourney Weaver, actress
 Governor Jerry Brown of California
 Christine Leinonen, Brandon Wolf, and Jose Arraigada, speaking about the Orlando nightclub shooting
 U.S. Senator Chris Murphy of Connecticut
 Erica Smegielski, speaking about the Sandy Hook Elementary School shooting
 Former Philadelphia Police Commissioner Charles H. Ramsey
 Angela Bassett, actress
 Felicia Sanders & Polly Sheppard, survivors of the Charleston church shooting
 Former U.S. Representative Gabby Giffords & Captain Mark Kelly, both of Arizona
 Rear Admiral John Hutson, U.S. Navy (retired)
 Kristen Kavanaugh, co-founder of the Military Acceptance Project
 Former CIA Director and Secretary of Defense Leon Panetta
 Second Lady of the United States Jill Biden
 Vice President Joe Biden (headliner)
 Mayor Kasim Reed of Atlanta, Georgia
 Former Mayor Michael Bloomberg of New York
 U.S. Senator Tim Kaine of Virginia, accepting the 2016 Democratic vice presidential nomination (headliner)
 Sharon Belkofer, mother of fallen Lt. Col. Thomas Belkofer
 President Barack Obama (headliner)
 Rev. Gabriel Salguero, delivering the benediction

 Fourth night (Thursday, July 28): Theme: "Stronger Together"
 Gene Karpinski, president of the League of Conservation Voters
 State Representative Peggy Flanagan of Minnesota
 U.S. Representative Ted Deutch of Florida
 Former Mayor Antonio Villaraigosa of Los Angeles, California
 Former State Representative Bakari Sellers of South Carolina
 Jaime Harrison, chairman of the South Carolina Democratic Party
 U.S. Representative Maxine Waters of California
 Chad Griffin, president of the Human Rights Campaign
 U.S. Representative Cedric Richmond of Louisiana
 State House Majority Leader Crisanta Duran of Colorado
 U.S. Representative Gwen Moore of Wisconsin
 State Representative Raumesh Akbari of Tennessee
 State Senator Ruben Kihuen of Nevada
 Former Mayor Michael Nutter of Philadelphia, Pennsylvania
 U.S. Representative Emanuel Cleaver of Missouri
 U.S. Representative Sean Patrick Maloney of New York and LGBT rights activist Sarah McBride
 Dolores Huerta, civil rights leader
 U.S. Representative Joyce Beatty of Ohio
 Governor Mark Dayton of Minnesota
 Mayor Eric Garcetti of Los Angeles, California
 Katie McGinty, Democratic nominee for the U.S. Senate in Pennsylvania
 U.S. Representative Tammy Duckworth
 U.S. Representative James Clyburn of South Carolina
 Marlon Marshall, Hillary for America Director of States and Political Engagement
 House Minority Leader Nancy Pelosi of California
 U.S. Senator Barbara Mikulski of Maryland, appearing alongside 11 other female Democratic Senators
 Hillary for America Latino Vote Director Lorella Praeli
 U.S. Representative Joaquín Castro of Texas
 Governor Andrew Cuomo of New York
 Nancy Pelosi of California, leader of House Democrats
 U.S. Representative Tim Ryan of Ohio
 Governor John Hickenlooper of Colorado
 Ted Danson and Mary Steenburgen, actors
 Henrietta Ivey, home care worker supporting a $15/hr minimum wage
 Dave Wills, 8th grade social studies teacher, speaking about student debt
 Beth Mathias
 Jensen Walcott & Jake Reed, former pizza parlor colleagues speaking about equal pay
 Governor Tom Wolf of Pennsylvania
 Former Governor Jennifer Granholm of Michigan
 Doug Elmets, former Reagan administration official
 Jennifer Pierotti Lim, Director of Health Policy for the U.S. Chamber of Commerce and co-founder of Republicans for Hillary
 Dallas Sheriff Lupe Valdez
 Jennifer Loudon, Wayne Walker, Wayne Owens, Barbara Owens, family members of fallen police officers
 Reverend William Barber, II, of North Carolina
 Kareem Abdul-Jabaar, professional basketball player
 Khizr Khan, with Ghazala Khan, father and mother of fallen Army Captain Humayun S. M. Khan
 U.S. Representative Ted Lieu of California
 General John R. Allen, U.S. Marine Corps (retired 4-star General), surrounded by dozens of veterans
 Captain Florent Groberg (retired), recipient of the Medal of Honor
 Chloë Grace Moretz, actress
 U.S. Representative Xavier Becerra of California
 U.S. Senator Sherrod Brown of Ohio
 Singer Katy Perry
 Chelsea Clinton, daughter of Bill and Hillary Clinton (headliner)
 2016 Democratic presidential nominee Hillary Clinton (headliner)
 Reverend Bill Shillady, delivering the benediction

Unlike previous conventions, sitting Cabinet members did not speak at the event; the White House decided that barring Cabinet officers from addressing the convention would "send a signal about the primacy of the Obama administration's responsibility to manage the government and serve the American people" and avoid legal or political difficulties.

List of performances 

 First night (Monday, July 25):
 Bobby Hill of the Keystone State Boychoir, singing "The Star-Spangled Banner"
 Boyz II Men, performing "Motownphilly"
 Demi Lovato, performing "Confident"
 Paul Simon, performing "Bridge over Troubled Water"
 Second night (Tuesday, July 26):
 Timmy Kelly, singing "The Star-Spangled Banner"
 Andra Day, performing "Rise Up"
 Alicia Keys, performing "Girl on Fire"
 Third night (Wednesday, July 27):
 Sebastien de la Cruz, 14-year-old mariachi singer from San Antonio, Texas, singing "The Star-Spangled Banner"
 Lenny Kravitz, performing "Let Love Rule"
 Fourth night (Thursday, July 28):
 Star Swain, singing "The Star-Spangled Banner"
 Carole King, performing "You've Got a Friend"
 Sheila E. and the E. Family
 Katy Perry, performing "Rise" and "Roar"
 Other performances:
 Snoop Dogg – performed at a concert following convention's final night
 Fergie Duhamel – performed at a charity benefit show at convention
 Cyndi Lauper and Idina Menzel – performed at women's luncheon
 Lady Gaga, Lenny Kravitz, and DJ Jazzy Jeff – performed at the "Camden Rising" concert at the BB&T Pavilion in Camden, New Jersey (across the Delaware River from Philadelphia) on the afternoon of July 28.

Notable speeches

Sarah Silverman 

Minnesota Senator Al Franken introduced fellow comedian Sarah Silverman, who is also a Bernie Sanders supporter. In her speech, she urged other Sanders supporters to back Hillary Clinton and later said that Bernie or Bust people "are being ridiculous". The Washington Post and Politico called this one of the most memorable moments of the night. The New York Times called her speech "the perfect breath of fresh air". Michael Grunwald of Politico coined the term "Silverman Democrats" for Sanders supporters who followed Sanders's advice to support Clinton in the general election.

Michelle Obama 

In her speech, First Lady Michelle Obama defended Hillary Clinton and urged Democrats to vote for Hillary, focusing on Clinton's role as a woman and a mother.
Obama alluded to Donald Trump's actions as reasons to vote for Clinton,
while attempting to heal the fractures within the party. Referencing her experience as a black woman in the White House, she said that although she lives in a "house that was built by slaves," seeing her children play on the White House lawn fills her with hope. She said: "Don't let anyone ever tell you that this country is not great. That somehow we need to make it great again. Because this right now is the greatest country on Earth."

One of the more memorable lines from Obama's speech was the motto she expressed, "when they go low, we go high", which developed into a political catchphrase.

The Atlantic described the speech as the best of the night and called it a speech "for the ages", a qualification echoed in other publications. David Smith of The Guardian called it a "profound, moving and devastating riposte to Donald Trump".

Bernie Sanders 

Vermont Senator and former Democratic candidate Bernie Sanders spoke on the first day of the Democratic Convention, urging his supporters to vote for presumptive nominee Hillary Clinton.

In his speech, Sanders told supporters that he understood and shared their disappointment "about the final results of the nominating process," but urged them to "take enormous pride in the historical accomplishments we have achieved," saying: "Together, my friends, we have begun a political revolution to transform America and that revolution – our revolution – continues."

Sanders offered a strong endorsement of Hillary Clinton, saying that America needed leadership that would "improve the lives of working families, children, the elderly, the sick and poor" and "bring our people together," and that "By these measures, any objective observer will conclude that – based on her ideas and her leadership – Hillary Clinton must become the next president of the United States." Sanders said "I am proud to stand with her."

On the second day of the convention, Sanders' delegates, with his approval, voted for him in the formal roll-call vote, although at the end of the roll-call vote Sanders moved to suspend the rules to and formally nominate Clinton for president, an important unifying gesture.

Bill Clinton 

Former President Bill Clinton spoke on the second night of the convention, telling the story of his life with his wife, Hillary Clinton. Clinton described his wife as someone who had fought for change throughout her entire life, beginning with their first meeting in law school in 1971. Clinton contrasted the Republican portrayal of his wife with what he argued is the "real one," relating anecdotes regarding Clinton's friends and family. Dylan Matthews of Vox called the speech a "typical first lady address," noting that the former president rarely touched on his own political career. Chris Cillizza of The Washington Post stated that Clinton talked about his wife in an "engaging, funny and, yes, sweet way".

Michael Bloomberg 

Former New York City Mayor Michael Bloomberg spoke on the third night of the convention, where he emphasized that he is not a Democrat, but endorsed Clinton anyway to "defeat a dangerous demagogue". Bloomberg's speech aimed to convince centrist voters that voting for Clinton is the "responsible" thing to do, as Bloomberg argued Trump would be a dangerous and unpredictable president. Chris Cillizza of The Washington Post wrote that Bloomberg gave a "searing and effective critique" of a fellow New York billionaire. After the speech, Reihan Salam of Slate wondered whether Bloomberg's speech foreshadowed future ideological battles in the Democratic Party between moderate "Bloombourgeoisie" and liberal "Sandernistas".

Deval Patrick 

The former Massachusetts Governor Deval Patrick speak Hillary as the next United States's hope with project against racism, continue of project of President Obama. Patrick says Hillary as allied more capacity for defeats Trump and augmented of protects against of Republican candidate.

Tim Kaine 

Having been nominated by acclamation earlier in the day, Kaine accepted the Democratic vice presidential nomination on the night of July 27. In one of his first major national speeches, Kaine discussed his life story, including his childhood as the son of an ironworker, his time in Honduras, and his response to the Virginia Tech shooting. Kaine also attacked Trump, arguing that, in contrast to Clinton, Trump had failed to explain what he would do once in office. Kaine performed an impression of Trump, mockingly repeating "believe me," and then arguing that Trump's past showed that he cannot be trusted. Kaine also strongly endorsed Clinton as the most qualified candidate for president, calling her lista, Spanish for "ready". After the speech, Morgan Winsor of ABC News noted the many Twitter users who described Kaine as "your friend's overly nice dad".

Barack Obama 

In one of the last major speeches of his presidency, Obama strongly endorsed Clinton as the nominee, saying "there has never been a man or woman more qualified than Hillary Clinton." Obama contrasted his and Clinton's hopeful view of America with that of Trump, which he called "deeply pessimistic". Obama argued that Trump is unqualified for the office, and is attempting to use fear to get elected. Michael Grunwald of Politico called it a "stirring but fundamentally defensive speech". Conservative blogger Erick Erickson tweeted "I disagree with the President on so much policy and his agenda, but appreciate the hope and optimism in this speech." After the speech, Clinton appeared on the stage for the first time in the convention, embracing her 2008 primary rival.

Sarah McBride 

Sarah McBride's speech made her the first openly transgender person to address a major party convention in American history.

Khizr Khan 

Khizr Khan, the father of Captain Humayun Khan, a Muslim-American soldier killed during Operation Iraqi Freedom, criticized Donald Trump's proposed ban on Muslim immigration. The speech was compared to Joseph N. Welch's famous rebuke during the Army–McCarthy hearings.

Chelsea Clinton 

Chelsea Clinton introduced her mother, Hillary Clinton, the Democratic nominee, by sharing her personal story about her relationship with her mother when she was younger. She also praised her for being a great mother, and said that her (Chelsea's) kids are proud of Hillary.

Hillary Clinton 

After being introduced by her daughter, Clinton accepted the Democratic presidential nomination on July 28, the final night of the convention. In her speech, Clinton asked voters to trust in her experience, judgment, and compassion based on her long public career. Clinton discussed what her priorities would be as president, saying that creating jobs would be her "primary mission," and that she would also seek to combat climate change, make college more affordable, and institute new gun laws. Clinton contrasted her hopeful vision and specific policy proposals with what she sees as Trump's fearmongering and vague ideas; she quoted Jackie regarding men moved by fear and pride. Eyder Peralta of NPR also noted that Clinton's "grounded" speech contrasted with the "soaring" speeches of President Obama. To supporters of her rival Bernie Sanders, Clinton stated "I want you to know, I've heard you," complimenting their energy and passion.

A Politico poll of "Democratic insiders" found highly positive reactions, though the insiders had slightly better reviews for the speeches of Michelle Obama and Barack Obama. A Gallup poll showed that Clinton's speech was viewed about 24 points more positively than negatively. Also, according to Gallup, 45% were more likely to vote for Clinton versus 41% who were less likely to vote for her based on what they saw/read about the convention. These net positives are higher than Trump's at the Republican National Convention. 
Sam Wang reported a 7% post-convention bounce for Clinton in general election polling (on the basis of the six polls released by 1 August 2016). According to FiveThirtyEight, Clinton's post-convention bounce was larger than Trump's.

Demonstrations and protests 

A total of 103 people were cited during the entire Democratic National Convention. Demonstrations by delegates on the convention floor were organized by the Bernie Delegates Network, led by California delegate Norman Solomon. In response to the email leak, many delegates protested the perceived bias and corruption of the Democratic National Committee on the opening day of the convention. Wasserman Schultz was repeatedly heckled as she addressed the Florida delegation, frequently interrupted by boos, jeers and cries of the word "shame", while some held up signs reading "emails". Sanders was booed by his delegates as he spoke to a crowd of roughly 1,900 and encouraged them to vote for Clinton. Some delegates on the convention floor repeatedly booed when the name of the presumptive nominee was mentioned. Sanders made a personal plea through a text message, asking his delegates to stop protesting. Nevertheless, protesting delegates continued to heckle speakers throughout the convention night, while chants of "No TPP" could be heard across the rally. Fifty-four citations were issued by local authorities during the protest on the first day of the convention.

On the second day of the convention, hundreds of Sanders delegates and supporters walked out of the convention in protest following Clinton's official nomination. They subsequently staged a sit-in at a nearby media tent. There were reports of American flags, pro-Sanders fliers, and one Israeli flag being set on fire by protesters. Demonstrations supporting Sanders and the Black Lives Matter movement marched through Philadelphia, attracting at least 1,000 people by nightfall.

On the third day, several protesters broke through the security fencing around the convention site and clashed with police before the police managed to re-secure the fencing; seven were arrested as a result. A woman was injured while trying to put out a flag that was set on fire. Several protesters were treated due to heat-related issues. Leon Panetta's speech was repeatedly interrupted by chants of "No more war" from Code Pink members within the Oregon delegation; they turned on their cellphone flashlights and continued to protest as the arena lights near them were turned off.

A small group of protesters heckled and booed as Clinton delivered her acceptance speech on the final night of the convention; they were eventually drowned out by the crowd.

Viewership (10:00 to 11:45 PM Eastern) 
On the first night of the convention, 25.74 million watched live coverage of the event from 10 p.m. to 11:30 p.m. on ABC, CBS, NBC, CNN, and MSNBC. The first night of the DNC had more viewers than both the first night of the 2012 DNC and the first night of the 2016 RNC. The first night of the DNC also generated just under 40 million Facebook activities from 10 million people, compared to 28.6 million convention-related Facebook interactions from 8.5 million people on the first night of the RNC. The first three nights of the Democratic National Convention had more television viewers than the first three nights of the Republican National Convention, but the final night of the RNC drew 34.9 million viewers compared to 33.7 million viewers watching the final night of the DNC.

Nielsen viewership data does not include views on PBS, C-SPAN, or livestreams. About 3.9 million viewed Clinton's acceptance speech on PBS, while a YouTube livestream of Clinton's speech peaked at 250,000 simultaneous viewers. On the final day of the convention, CNN received 11 million "video starts" on desktops and mobile devices.

Night 1

Total viewers

Viewers 25 to 54

Night 2

Total viewers

Viewers 25 to 54

Night 3

Total viewers

Viewers 25 to 54

Night 4

Total viewers

Viewers 25 to 54

See also 
 Democratic Party presidential candidates, 2016
 Democratic Party presidential primaries, 2016
 Hillary Rodham Clinton presidential campaign, 2016
 2016 Republican National Convention
 2016 Libertarian National Convention
 2016 Green National Convention
 Democratic National Convention
 United States presidential nominating convention

References

External links 

 Official website of the Democratic National Convention
 Official website of the Philadelphia 2016 Host Committee
 C-SPAN videos (and transcripts) of all of the speeches
 Clinton Nomination Acceptance Speech for President at DNC (transcript) at The American Presidency Project
 Video of Clinton nomination acceptance speech for President at DNC (via YouTube)
 Audio of Clinton nomination acceptance speech for President at DNC
 Video of Kaine nomination acceptance speech for Vice President at DNC (via YouTube)
 Audio of Kaine nomination acceptance speech for Vice President at DNC
 Transcript of Kaine nomination acceptance speech for Vice President at DNC

 
2016 conferences
Democratic National Convention
DNC
Articles containing video clips
Democratic National Conventions
Pennsylvania Democratic Party
Political events in Pennsylvania
Democratic National Convention
Democratic National Convention
Democratic National Convention, 2016
Political conventions in Philadelphia
Tim Kaine
Democratic National Convention